Katie or Katy Davis may refer to:

Katie Davis (actress), on the radio program This American Life
Katie Davis (missionary) (born 1989), missionary and author
19766 Katiedavis, an asteroid
Katie Davis (judoka) (born 1986), American Paralympic judoka
Katy Davis, actress in My Friend Joe

See also
Kate Davis (born 1991), American voice actress
Kate Davis (director) (born 1960s), American director
Katherine Davis (disambiguation)

Davis, Katie